Michael C. F. Wiescher (born 1949 in Wuppertal) is a German-American experimental nuclear physicist and astrophysicist, known for his laboratory research in nuclear physics connected with various astrophysical phenomena such as stellar evolution and explosion environments.

Education and career
Wiescher completed in 1969 his Abitur at Gymnasium Münchberg in Bavaria. At the University of Münster, he graduated in 1972 with Vordiplom in physics, in 1975 with Diplom in solid state physics, and in 1980 with doctorate (summa cum laude) in nuclear physics. His doctoral dissertation entitled Measurement of the Reactions in the CNO Cycles was supervised by Claus Rolfs. As a post-doc Wiescher was from 1980 to 1983 at the Ohio State University, from 1983 to 1985 under the supervision of Karl-Ludwig Kratz at the University of Mainz, and from 1985 to 1986 ​​at Caltech's  Kellogg Radiation Laboratory. At the University of Notre Dame he was from 1986 to 1990 an assistant professor, from 1990 to 1993, and from 1993 to 1998 a full professor, before his appointment as Freimann Professor of Physics in 1998. In addition to his Freimann Professorship, he is now the director of the Joint Institute for Nuclear Astrophysics (JINA) at the University of Notre Dame, the Michigan State University and the University of Chicago. He is also an adjunct professor at Michigan State University and the University of Surrey. He has served as an editorial board member for Physical Review C and as an associate editor for Nuclear Physics A.

He has done research in nuclear astrophysics, low-energy experimental physics, reaction physics with stable and radioactive beams, and analysis of cultural heritage artifacts.

Wiescher is the author or co-author of over 350 research publications. He is the author of local historical writings about his birthplace Wuppertal, a biography of Arthur E. Haas, and the textbook Radioaktivität Ursprung und Auswirkungen eines Naturphänomens. Band I'''' (in German), as well as the co-author, with Khachatur Manukyan, of the textbook Scientific Analysis of Cultural Heritage Objects''.

He has given over 100 presentations at national and international conferences. At the 2021 Fall Meeting of the APS Division of Nuclear Physics, he presented research, done with Khachatur Manukyan, using X-rays, electron microscopy, and accelerators to investigate coins and paper money from three different historical periods.

Wiescher was elected in 1998 a fellow of the American Physical Society (APS), in 2009 a fellow of the American Association for the Advancement of Science, and in 2017 a foreign member of Academia Europaea. He received in 2003 the Hans A. Bethe Prize of the APS, in 2007 the Humboldt Prize of the Alexander von Humboldt Foundation, and in 2018 the LAD Laboratory Astrophysics Prize of the American Astronomical Society.

His doctoral students include Hendrik Schatz.

Selected publications
 
 
 
  (over 800 citations)
  2001
 
 
 
  (over 750 citations)
 
 
 
  (over 800 citations)
 
 
 
 
 
 
  sample chapter

References

External links
 
 
 

1949 births
Living people
University of Münster alumni
University of Notre Dame faculty
20th-century German physicists
21st-century German physicists
20th-century American physicists
21st-century American physicists
German nuclear physicists
American nuclear physicists
German astrophysicists
American astrophysicists
Fellows of the American Physical Society
Fellows of the American Association for the Advancement of Science
Members of Academia Europaea
Scientists from Wuppertal